The Best American Poetry 1993, a volume in The Best American Poetry series, was edited by David Lehman and by guest editor Louise Glück.

Poets and poems included

See also
 1993 in poetry

Notes

External links
 Web page for contents of the book, with links to each publication where the poems originally appeared

Best American Poetry series
1993 poetry books
American poetry anthologies